Emmanuel Dorado Rodríguez (born 28 March 1973) is a French former professional footballer who played as a central defender. He coaches Sainte-Geneviève Sports.

Career 
Dorado played for European clubs such as Paris Saint-Germain, Angers SCO, UD Almería, Málaga CF, and Córdoba CF.

Dorado was at the centre of an unpaid wages controversy while at Livingston following the side's relegation from the Scottish Premier League. The Scottish Football League imposed a transfer embargo on Livingston due to their failure to settle Dorado's contract. Livingston argued that they have settled the contract and that the embargo should be lifted. He contributed to their victorious 2003–04 Scottish League Cup campaign, including playing the full 90 minutes as they beat Hibernian in the 2004 Scottish League Cup Final.

The embargo was lifted from Livingston on the introduction of a new board of Italians, who paid the overdue wages.

Managerial career 
Dorado has worked as the manager of Sainte-Geneviève Sports since 2008. Jean-Claude Fernandes, his teammate at Paris Saint-Germain, is currently the sporting director of the club.

References

External links
 
 
 

1973 births
Living people
Association football central defenders
French footballers
French people of Spanish descent
Paris Saint-Germain F.C. players
Livingston F.C. players
Angers SCO players
La Liga players
UD Almería players
Málaga CF players
Córdoba CF players
Scottish Premier League players
Expatriate footballers in Scotland
Expatriate footballers in Spain
French expatriate footballers